DYXX is a callsign once shared by two Philippines broadcast stations traditionally associated with GMA Network in Iloilo City:

 DYXX, 1323 kHz AM, the original callsign for what is now radio station DYSI
 DYXX-TV, TV channel 6